Chrysodema radians is a species of Jewel Beetle of the Buprestidae family.

Subspecies
 Chrysodema radians nicobarica Thomson, 1879 
 Chrysodema radians radians (Guérin-Ménéville, 1830)

Description
These beetles have a glossy surface with metallic green color.

Distribution
Chrysodema radians can be found in Indonesia and Northern Australia.

References

radians
Buprestidae
Beetles described in 1830